Dombeya ledermannii is a species of flowering plant in the family Malvaceae. It is found in Cameroon and Nigeria. Its natural habitat is subtropical or tropical dry forests. It is threatened by habitat loss.

References

ledermannii
Flora of Cameroon
Flora of Nigeria
Critically endangered plants
Taxonomy articles created by Polbot